MIL 40 is a class of fast inshore patrol craft operated by both naval forces of Iran.

Design
The boats are based on a model of Italian FB Design motorboats acquired by Iran in 2002. Thy are structurally monohull, and made of Kevlar.

Armament 
MIL 40 boats are equipped with either a central machine gun mounted on forward, or two machine guns mounted on each side of the boat. A multiple rocket launcher is also installed on the roof.

References 

Fast patrol boat classes of the Navy of the Islamic Revolutionary Guard Corps
Ships built by Marine Industries Organization